is a railway station in the city of Nanao, Ishikawa, Japan, jointly operated by the West Japan Railway Company (JR West) and the private railway operator Noto Railway.

Lines

Station layout
The station consists of one ground-level side platform and two staggered and co-joined side platforms. The platforms are connected by a footbridge. The station has a Midori no Madoguchi staffed ticket office.

Platforms

History
The station opened on April 24, 1898. With the privatization of Japanese National Railways (JNR) on 1 April 1987, the station came under the control of JR West.

Passenger statistics
In fiscal 2015, the JR West portion of the station was used by an average of 1,138 passengers daily and the Noto Railway portion of the station was used by an average of 476 passengers daily (boarding passengers only).

Surrounding area
Nanao City Hall
Ishikawa Nanao Art Museum
Nanao High School

See also
 List of railway stations in Japan

References

External links

 JR West - Nanao Station 
 Noto Railway - Nanao Station 

Railway stations in Ishikawa Prefecture
Stations of West Japan Railway Company
Railway stations in Japan opened in 1898
Nanao Line
Nanao, Ishikawa